William G. Hutchinson (1877-date of death unknown), was a Canadian international lawn bowls player who competed in the 1934 British Empire Games.

Bowls career
At the 1934 British Empire Games he won the silver medal in the pairs event with Alfred Langford.

Personal life
He was a superintendent by trade and was resident at the Strand Hotel during the Games along with the most of the other Canadian bowlers.

References

Canadian male bowls players
Bowls players at the 1934 British Empire Games
Commonwealth Games silver medallists for Canada
Commonwealth Games medallists in lawn bowls
1877 births
Year of death missing
Medallists at the 1934 British Empire Games